Albertville (Arpitan: Arbèrtvile) is a subprefecture of the Savoie department in the Auvergne-Rhône-Alpes region in Southeastern France. 
It is best known for hosting the 1992 Winter Olympics and Paralympics. In 2018, the commune had a population of 19,214; its urban area had 39,780 inhabitants.

Geography
Albertville is one of two subprefectures of the Savoie department, alongside Saint-Jean-de-Maurienne.

Albertville is situated on the river Arly, close to the confluence with the river Isère. Nearby mountains include: Belle Étoile, Dent de Cons, Négresse, Roche Pourrie, Mirantin, Pointe de la Grande Journée, Chaîne du Grand Arc. Nearby mountain ranges include the Bauges, the Beaufortain and the beginning of the Vanoise.

History

The modern city of Albertville was formed in 1836 by King Charles Albert of Sardinia, who merged the medieval town of Conflans, which had buildings dating to the 14th century, with the town of L'Hôpital. Since then, Albertville has fostered trade between France, Italy and Switzerland. Industries such as paper mills and hydroelectricity are found along its river.

The 1992 Winter Olympics were organised in the Savoie region, with Albertville hosting it. Some of the sports venues were later adapted for other uses. Some sports venues still remain, such as the ice rink, La halle de glace Olympique, designed by the architect Jacques Kalisz. Despite this, the town remains more industrial than touristic.

In 2003, the town was labelled a "Town of Art and History".

Population

Transport
Albertville station was put into service in 1879 by the Compagnie des chemins de fer de Paris à Lyon et à la Méditerranée (PLM).

Notable people
 Gérard Mourou (born 1944), Nobel Prize winner in Physics, 2018
 Justine Braisaz (born 1996), Olympic champion and world medalist in biathlon
 Jean-Luc Crétier (born 1966), Olympic champion in alpine skiing (WOC 1998, downhill)
 Léa Lemare (born 1996), ski jumper and national champion
 Florine De Leymarie (born 1981), skier
 Jérôme Jarre (born 1990), comedian on the Vine app
 Julia Simon (biathlete) (born 1996), world champion in biathlon

Sites of interest
La halle de glace Olympique, or the Olympic ice hall, the ice arena that hosted events during the 1992 Winter Olympics.
L'anneau de vitesse, or speed oval, the athletic stadium that previously served as the site of the speed skating competitions of 1992 Winter Olympics.

International relations

Albertville is twinned with:
  Aosta, Italy
  Winnenden, Baden-Württemberg, Germany
  Sainte-Adèle, Quebec, Canada
  Vancouver, British Columbia, Canada, which like Albertville, hosted a Winter Olympics, doing so in 2010

Heraldry

See also
Communes of the Savoie department
1992 Winter Olympics

References

External links

 City council website
 Tourism webpage about Albertville (in French)
 Tourism webpage about Albertville(in English)

 
Communes of Savoie
Subprefectures in France
Populated places established in 1836
Ceutrones